Neptune High School is a comprehensive four-year community public high school that serves students in ninth through twelfth grades from Neptune Township, in Monmouth County, New Jersey, United States, operating as part of the Neptune Township Schools. Neptune Township Schools is one of New Jersey's 31 former Abbott districts. The school has been accredited by the Middle States Association of Colleges and Schools Commission on Elementary and Secondary Schools since 1929.

As of the 2021–22 school year, the school had an enrollment of 1,212 students and 97.0 classroom teachers (on an FTE basis), for a student–teacher ratio of 12.5:1. There were 405 students (33.4% of enrollment) eligible for free lunch and 76 (6.3% of students) eligible for reduced-cost lunch.

History
In 1897, the site in Ocean Grove was leased to the school district for the purpose of creating Neptune High School. Completed in 1898, the then school had won an award at the 1906 World's Fair for its architectural splendor. The school opened in 1897, with Lida Doren serving as the state's first female principal and superintendent. The building was used until September 1960, when it was replaced by the district's existing high school building. The building had been used as a school up until the 1980s, after which the state of the building was allowed to decline. In 2004, the original building was repurposed as the Jersey Shore Arts Center.

Awards, recognition and rankings
The school was the 292nd-ranked public high school in New Jersey out of 339 schools statewide in New Jersey Monthly magazine's September 2014 cover story on the state's "Top Public High Schools", using a new ranking methodology. The school had been ranked 283rd in the state of 328 schools in 2012, after also being ranked 283rd in 2010 out of 322 schools listed. The magazine ranked the school 268th in 2008 out of 316 schools. The school was ranked 221st in the magazine's September 2006 issue, which surveyed 316 schools across the state.

Athletics
The Neptune High School Scarlet Fliers compete in Division B North of the Shore Conference, an athletic conference comprised of public and private high schools in Monmouth and Ocean counties along the Jersey Shore. The league operates under the jurisdiction of the New Jersey State Interscholastic Athletic Association (NJSIAA). With 970 students in grades 10–12, the school was classified by the NJSIAA for the 2019–20 school year as Group III for most athletic competition purposes, which included schools with an enrollment of 761 to 1,058 students in that grade range. The school was classified by the NJSIAA as Group IV South for football for 2018–2020.

The boys track team won the Group II spring track state championship in 1939 and 1940 (as co-champion).

The boys' basketball team won the Group II state championship in 1949 with a win over Millburn High School, won the Group IV title in 1981 with a win against Malcolm X Shabazz High School, and won the Group III title in 2002 vs. Weequahic High School and 2009 against Teaneck High School. The team won the 1949 Group II state championship with a 47–45 win against Merchantville High School in the semifinals and 62–59 against Millburn in the championship game. The 1981 team was the state's only unbeaten boys basketball team, finishing the season 29-0 after taking their first lead of the game in the middle of the fourth quarter of the championship game on its way to winning the Group IV title with a 60–55 win against Malcolm X Shabazz at Jadwin Gymnasium. Led by Taquan Dean, the 2002 team won the Group III title with an 84–58 win against Weequahic in the championship game at the Louis Brown Athletic Center and advanced to the Tournament of Champions, where the team received a bye as the second seed and defeated third-seeded East Side High School 71–63 in the semifinals before falling to top-seed St. Anthony High School 69–49 in the finals at the Continental Airlines Arena to finish the season with a 29–3 record.

The boys track team won the indoor track Group IV state championship in 1974 and 1976. The girls team won the Group IV championship in 1987 (as co-champion), the Group II titles in 1995-96 and the Group III title in 2009 (co-champion)

In 1976, the boys' track team won the Group IV state indoor relay championship. The girls team won the Group III title in 1996.

The boys track team won the winter track Meet of Champions in 1976.

The 1980 boys' soccer team finished the season with a record of 21-3 after winning the program's first Group IV state championship, defeating Columbia High School in the tournament final at Mercer County Park by the score of 3–1.

The girls' basketball team won the Group IV state championships in 1984 against Plainfield High School, in 2010 vs. Pascack Valley High School and in 2011 defeated Teaneck. The girls' basketball team won the 2011 state championship, topping St. John Vianney High School by a score of 67–48 in the finals of the Tournament of Champions in a game played at the Izod Center, earning the first ToC championship for the school and for any school in the Shore Conference.

The field hockey team won the Central Jersey Group IV state sectional title in 1984 and 1986, and won the Group IV state championship in 1986.

The girls spring track team was the Group IV state champion in 1987 and 2012.

The football team won the Central Jersey Group III state sectional title in 1995, 1997, 1998 and 2011.

Administration
The school's principal is Kevin McCarthy. His administration team includes two vice principals.

Notable alumni

 Lynn Ahrens (born 1948, class of 1966), writer and lyricist for the musical theatre, television and film.
 Jack Armstrong (born 1965), former Major League Baseball pitcher.
 Pat Battle (born 1959, class of 1977), WNBC-TV's New Jersey Bureau Reporter, Saturday Today (NBC) in New York co-anchor, and occasional fill in anchor.
 John Best (born 1971), former professional basketball player.
 Scott "Bam Bam" Bigelow (1961–2007), professional wrestler.
 Vinny Curry (born 1988), defensive end for the Philadelphia Eagles.
 Bob Davis (born 1945; class of 1963), former NFL quarterback whose career included three seasons with the New York Jets.
 Dan Gonzalez (born 1974), American player of gridiron football.
 Jake Jones (born 1949; class of 1967), former NBA player for the Philadelphia 76ers and Cincinnati Royals.
 Keith Kirkwood (born 1993, class of 2013), wide receiver for the New Orleans Saints of the National Football League.
 Harry Larrison Jr. (1926-2005, class of 1945), politician who served on the Monmouth County Board of Chosen Freeholders for nearly 39 years, marking the longest tenure of a Freeholder in New Jersey history.
 Vini Lopez (born 1949, class of 1967), drummer who backed Bruce Springsteen in several bands, including Steel Mill and the E Street Band between 1968 and 1974.
 Cory Nelms (born 1988), NFL player.
 Joseph A. Palaia (1927-2016), politician who served in the New Jersey General Assembly from 1981 to 1989 and in the State Senate from 1989 to 2008, representing the 11th Legislative District.
 Taqwa Pinero (born 1983 as Taquan Dean), basketball player for Élan Béarnais Pau-Lacq-Orthez of the LNB Pro A.
 Haydn Proctor (1903–1996), politician and judge who served as President of the New Jersey Senate and Associate Justice of the New Jersey Supreme Court.
 Q Lazzarus (1960–2022), singer best known for her 1988 song "Goodbye Horses", which became a cult classic after being prominently featured in a scene from Jonathan Demme's 1991 film The Silence of the Lambs.
 Ed Radwanski (born 1963, class of 1981), former professional soccer player who played for the 1985 US National team and was head coach of the UNC-G Women's soccer team.
 Nate Ramsey (born 1941), football player, safety and cornerback who played for the Philadelphia Eagles for most of his 11-year NFL career (1963–1973).
 Len Renery (born 1948, class of 1966), retired English-American professional soccer defender and coach.
 Karl Roberson (born 1990), professional mixed martial artist and former kickboxer currently competing in the middleweight division of the Ultimate Fighting Championship.
 Isaac Schlossbach (1891–1984), polar explorer, submariner and aviation pioneer.
 Southside Johnny (born 1948 as John Lyon), singer-songwriter and frontman of the Asbury Jukes.
 Richard R. Stout (1912–1986), politician who served in the New Jersey Senate from 1952 to 1974.
 Garry Tallent (born 1949, class of 1967), musician and record producer, best known for being bass player and founding member of the E Street Band.
 Valerie Terrigno (born 1954), former mayor of West Hollywood, California
 Ronald R. Thomas (born 1949, class of 1967), writer, educator, and 13th president of the University of Puget Sound.
 Joe Vetrano (1918–1995; class of 1936), football player who was a member of the inaugural team of the San Francisco 49ers.
 Dennis Walters (born 1949), trick-shot golfer who won the Bob Jones Award in 2018 and was inducted into the World Golf Hall of Fame with the class of 2019.

References

External links 
Neptune High School
Neptune Township Schools

School Data for the Neptune Township Schools, National Center for Education Statistics

Neptune Township, New Jersey
Public high schools in Monmouth County, New Jersey